The R400 is a Regional Route in South Africa that connects Riebeek East with the R75 to Jansenville.

External links
 Routes Travel Info

References

Regional Routes in the Eastern Cape